Asaphodes aegrota is a species of moth in the family Geometridae. It was first described by Arthur Gardiner Butler in 1879 as Selidosema aegrota. It is endemic to New Zealand and can be found in the North, South and Stewart Islands. This species inhabits open spaces in lowland native forest. The larvae of A. aegrota feed on native herbs and have also been observed feeding of the introduced lawn daisy. The adults are variable in appearance with the markings on both sides of its wings varying in intensity. Some populations also have narrow winged females. Adults are on the wing from November until March.

Taxonomy 

This species was first described by Arthur Gardiner Butler in 1879 using specimens collected at Wairarapa by F. W. Hutton and named Selidosema aegrota. George Hudson discussed and illustrated this species under the name Xanthorhoe aegrota in 1898 and again in 1928. In 1939 Louis Beethoven Prout placed this species in the genus Larentia. This placement was not accepted by New Zealand taxonomists. In 1971 J. S. Dugdale placed this species in the genus Asaphodes. In 1988 Dugdale confirmed this placement in his catalogue of New Zealand Lepidoptera. The male holotype specimen is held at the Natural History Museum, London.

Description 

Butler originally described this species as follows:
This species is variable in appearance and the intensity of the markings on both the lower and upper sides of its wings can vary considerably. It also has populations that have narrow winged females such as in the Wairau Valley, Marlborough.

Distribution
This species is endemic to New Zealand and can be found on the North, South and Stewart Islands.

Habitat 
This species inhabits open spaces in lowland native forest. Hudson observed it amongst Discaria toumatou.

Behaviour 
The adults of this species are on the wing from November until March.

Host species 

Larvae of this species feed on herbs. They have also been found feeding on introduced lawn daisies.

References

Moths described in 1879
Moths of New Zealand
Larentiinae
Endemic fauna of New Zealand
Taxa named by Arthur Gardiner Butler
Endemic moths of New Zealand